Nemacheilus dori (Palestine Loach) is a species of ray-finned fish in the family Balitoridae.
It is found only in Israel.
Its natural habitat is rivers.
It is threatened by habitat loss.

References

dori
Fish described in 1982
Taxonomy articles created by Polbot